Javier Castro may refer to:
 Javier Castro (footballer, born 1991), Mexican football forward for Moreno Valley
 Javier Castro (footballer, born 2000), Spanish football centre-back for Alcorcón